Adam Brian London (born 12 October 1988) is an English first-class cricketer. He is a left-handed batsman and right arm off spinner.

Born in Ashford, Middlesex, London played for Middlesex and was given the no.19 squad number.

After his short professional career, London became the Director of Cricket at Richmond Cricket Club in South West London

Early career
London played for the Middlesex 2nd XI cricket team and has a highest score of 196 against Sussex at Horsham in the Second XI Championship, and 111* in the 2nd XI Trophy.

London came on the pitch for England against Australia in the Ashes as a substitute fielder for Kevin Pietersen on 17 July 2009, the second day of the second Test of the series at Lords.

London made his first-class debut in August 2009, for Middlesex at Lord's against Gloucestershire scoring 68 and 11.

References

Essex Second XI v. Middlesex Second XI, August 2008
Middlesex Second XI v. Essex Second XI, September 2008

External links
Adam London at Middlesex County Cricket Club

1988 births
English cricketers
Middlesex cricketers
Living people
Hampshire cricketers
People educated at The Bishop Wand Church of England School
English cricketers of the 21st century